Piwr, Pyowr, Pyur, or P'ywr (uppercase: Փ, lowercase: փ) is the 35th letter of the Armenian alphabet. It represents the aspirated voiceless bilabial stop (/pʰ/). Its capital form is homoglyphic to the Cyrillic letter Ef, the Greek letter Phi, and the symbol for the voiceless bilabial fricative. The lowercase form is the letter Tyun with two additional vertical lines jutting on the top and the bottom. It has a value of 8000 as an Armenian numeral.

Computing codes

Gallery

See also
 Armenian alphabet
 Armenian language
 Ef (Cyrillic)
 Phi (letter)
 Voiceless bilabial fricative

References
 https://bararanonline.com/%D6%83-%D5%BF%D5%A1%D5%BC%D5%A8

External links
 Փ on Wiktionary
 փ on Wiktionary

Armenian letters